Anyama is a city in south-eastern Ivory Coast. It is a suburb of Abidjan and is one of four sub-prefectures of Abidjan Autonomous District. Anyama is also a commune. The city is located about 20 kilometres north of Abidjan.

Villages in the sub-prefecture include Akoupé-Zeudji, Attinguié, and M'Bonoua.

Sport
Anyama is represented in football by Rio Sport d'Anyama.

Notable people 
 Gervinho, Ivorian international footballer
 Arouna Koné, Ivorian international footballer

Notes

Sub-prefectures of Abidjan
Communes of Abidjan